This is the complete filmography of actress Yvonne De Carlo (September 1, 1922January 8, 2007).

Film

Short subjects

Unfinished film projects

Television

Radio

Stage appearances
Hollywood Revels - May, 1941 - Orpheum - performed the number "Dance of the Heat Wave"
Glamour Over Hollywood - December, 1941 - Florentine Gardens, Los Angeles
performed the hula number "A Night in Hawaii" in the eight annual police show at the Shrine Auditorium - May, 1942
an estimated fifteen West Coast rodeos at various venues in the 1940s

nightclub appearance at the Cocoanut Grove - October 1959

References

Bibliography

External links

 

Actress filmographies
American filmographies
Canadian filmographies